Corporate park may refer to:

Business park
Industrial park
Science park